Basketball is one of the 26 sports scheduled for the 2019 Pacific Games which will be held in Apia, Samoa.

Competition format
The 8 teams will be split into two pools of four where round-robin matches will be played with the top two from each pool advancing to the semi-finals or the medal play-offs.

Qualification
For the first time ever, teams would have to qualify for the event in order to participate in the basketball competition either for men or women through sub-zone qualification tournaments in Melanesia, Micronesia, and Polynesia.

Men's tournament

Qualified teams

Women's tournament

Qualified teams

Men's 3x3 tournament

Women's 3x3 tournament

Participating nations
Ten countries are expected to compete in basketball at the 2019 Pacific Games:
  (12)
  (12)
  (24)
  (24)
  (24)
  (24)
  (24) (Host)
  (12)
  (24)
  (12)

Medal summary

Medal table

Results

References

 
2019 Pacific Games
2019
2019 in basketball